Vicente Carmelo Gallo (October 3, 1873June 3, 1942) was an Argentine lawyer, academic, politician, and member of the Radical Civic Union and the Antipersonalist Radical Civic Union.

Life

Born in San Miguel de Tucumán, Gallo joined the  Radical Civic Union (UCR) from its inception, forming part of a group of young people who worked with Hipólito Yrigoyen in the mid-1890s to secure universal male suffrage. Following the passage of the Sáenz Peña Law to that effect, he was elected to Congress in 1912 on the UCR ticket, and to the  Senate (1919-1923), always representing the city of Buenos Aires.

In 1920, Gallo was one of the founding members of the Argentine Patriotic League, a far-right paramilitary organization. President Marcelo Torcuato de Alvear named Gallo Minister of Internal Affairs in 1923, and in 1924, he was part of a group of UCR members who broke with their longtime leader, the populist Yrigoyen, and formed the splinter Antipersonalist UCR.  He resigned in 1926 when Alvear declined to support his proposal for a federal intervention in Buenos Aires Province, where a moderate UCR figure, Valentín Vergara, had been elected governor.

Supported by conservatives since his attempted removal of Governor Vergara, he was the Anti-Personalist UCR candidate for Vice-President, as running mate to Leopoldo Melo, in the 1928 elections. Yrigoyen defeated their ticket in a landslide, however.

Between 1934 and 1941 Gallo was Dean of the University of Buenos Aires, where he was a professor in Administrative Law. He was married to Celia Gallo, the daughter of his uncle, politician Delfín Gallo.

References

1873 births
1942 deaths
People from San Miguel de Tucumán
Radical Civic Union politicians
Members of the Argentine Chamber of Deputies elected in Buenos Aires
Members of the Argentine Senate for Buenos Aires
University of Buenos Aires alumni
Academic staff of the University of Buenos Aires
Rectors of the University of Buenos Aires
Ministers of Internal Affairs of Argentina